Leatrice Joy (born Leatrice Johanna Zeidler; November 7, 1893 – May 13, 1985) was an American actress most prolific during the silent film era.

Early life
Joy was born in New Orleans, Louisiana to dentist Edward Joseph Zeidler, who was of Austrian and French descent, and Mary Joy Crimens, who was of German and Irish descent. She had a brother, Billy, who later worked at Metro-Goldwyn-Mayer. 

She attended the Convent of the Sacred Heart in New Orleans, where she had planned on becoming a nun, but left when her father was diagnosed with tuberculosis and was forced to give up his dental practice. She tried out for the New Orleans-based Nola Film Company in 1915 and was hired as an actress. Her mother disapproved of her becoming an actress, but the family needed the money, so her mother accompanied her to California, where she began working in plays and films.

Career

Silent films

Joy began her acting career in stock theater companies and soon made her film debut; between April 1916 and November 1917, she was the star of about 20 one-reel Black Diamond Comedies produced by the United States Motion Picture Corporation in Wilkes-Barre, Pennsylvania, and released nationally by Paramount Pictures. In many of these, she starred as "Susie," an irrepressibly enthusiastic, impulsive young woman who gets into humorous scrapes.

In late 1917 she relocated to the relatively young film colony in Hollywood, California and began appearing in comedy shorts opposite Billy West and Oliver Hardy. Signed under contract with Samuel Goldwyn Studios, her first role for the studio was in 1917's The Pride of the Clan opposite Mary Pickford. Her career quickly gained momentum, and by 1920 she had become a highly-popular actress with the filmgoing public and was given leading-lady status opposite such performers as Wallace Beery, Conrad Nagel, Nita Naldi, and Irene Rich.

Directors often cast Joy in the "strong-willed independent woman" role, and the liberated atmosphere of the Jazz Age Roaring Twenties solidified her public popularity, especially with female movie goers. Her close-cropped hair and somewhat boyish persona (she was often cast as a woman mistaken for a young man) became fashionable during the era. With her increasing popularity, Joy was sought out by Cecil B. DeMille, who signed her to Paramount Pictures in 1922, immediately casting her in that year's successful high-society drama Saturday Night opposite Conrad Nagel. Joy starred in a number of successful releases for Paramount and was heavily promoted as one of DeMille's most prominent protégées.

In 1925, against the advice of studio executives, Joy parted ways with Paramount and followed DeMille to his new film company Producers Distributing Corporation, for which she made a few moderately successful films, including Lois Weber's last silent film The Angel of Broadway in 1927. After Joy impulsively cut her hair extremely short in 1926, DeMille was publicly angry as it prevented her from portraying traditional feminine roles. The studio developed projects to promote the “Leatrice Joy bob” which she wore in Made for Love, Eve's Leaves, The Clinging Vine, For Alimony Only, and Vanity. Although she regrew her hair after styles changed in early 1927, a professional dispute ended the DeMille/Joy partnership in 1928, and she was signed with MGM. That year, she headlined MGM's second part-talkie effort, The Bellamy Trial opposite Betty Bronson and Margaret Livingston.

Transition to sound
Joy's career began to falter with the advent of talkies, possibly because her heavy Southern accent was considered unfashionable in comparison with other actresses' refined "Mid-Atlantic" diction. In 1929, she became a freelance actress without a long term contract. In order to improve her chances of regaining her film career, she undertook a vaudeville tour from 1929 to 1931, as a training ground for returning successfully to talkies. She was particularly interested in improving her voice and learning how to better handle dialogue.

Retirement and later years
By the early 1930s, Joy was semi-retired from the motion-picture industry, but she later made several guest appearances in a few modestly-successful films, such as 1951's Love Nest, which featured a young Marilyn Monroe.

In the 1960s, Joy retired to Greenwich, Connecticut, where she lived with her daughter and son-in-law.

Joy appeared as a subject on the game show To Tell the Truth on July 1, 1963.

She was interviewed in the television documentary series Hollywood: A Celebration of the American Silent Film (1980).

Personal life
Joy was married three times and had one child. On March 22, 1922, she married actor John Gilbert. They had a daughter, Leatrice, who later acted in bit parts; she was the first wife of novelist and playwright Ernest Gébler. Joy filed for divorce in August 1924, citing Gilbert's infidelity and alcoholism. Joy's second marriage was to businessman William Spencer Hook on October 22, 1931; they divorced in 1944. Joy's third and final marriage was to former actor and electrical engineer Arthur Kem Westermark. They married on March 5, 1945, in Mexico City and divorced in October 1954.

During her silent film career in the 1920s, she was Hollywood's best known Christian Scientist.

Death
On May 13, 1985, Joy died from acute anemia at the High Ridge House Christian Science nursing home in Riverdale, Bronx, New York. She was interred at the Saint Savior Episcopal Churchyard in Old Greenwich, Connecticut. 

For her contribution to the motion picture industry, Leatrice Joy has a star on the Hollywood Walk of Fame at 6517 Hollywood Blvd. in Hollywood, California.

Filmography

References

External links

 
 Leatrice Joy at Silents Are Golden
 Leatrice Joy at Silent Era People
 Leatrice Joy at Silent Ladies & Gents
 Leatrice Joy at The International Silent Movie
 Leatrice Joy at Virtual History

1893 births
1985 deaths
20th-century American actresses
Actresses from New Orleans
American Christian Scientists
American film actresses
American silent film actresses
American stage actresses
American television actresses
Burials in Connecticut
Deaths from anemia
Paramount Pictures contract players
Converts to Christian Science from Roman Catholicism